Louise Rose Babaud de la Chaussade (1747-1817), was a French memoir writer.  She is known for her memoirs, describing her life during the French revolution.  Her memoirs how she managed the major iron works industry during the imprisonment of her spouse during the Reign of Terror.

References

1747 births
1817 deaths
French memoirists
People of the French Revolution
French ironmasters
18th-century French businesswomen
18th-century French businesspeople
18th-century French women writers
French women memoirists
18th-century ironmasters